The 2019 Viterra Saskatchewan Scotties Tournament of Hearts, the provincial women's curling championship for Saskatchewan, was held January from 22–27 at the Humboldt Curling Club in Humboldt. The winning Robyn Silvernagle team represented Saskatchewan at the 2019 Scotties Tournament of Hearts in Sydney, Nova Scotia.

Qualification

Teams

The teams are listed as follows:

Round robin standings

Round robin results
All draw times are listed in Central Standard Time (UTC-06:00)

Draw 1
Tuesday, January 22, 16:00

Draw 2
Tuesday, January 22, 21:30

Draw 3
Wednesday, January 23, 11:30

Draw 4
Wednesday, January 23, 16:30

Draw 5
Wednesday, January 23, 21:30

Draw 6
Thursday, January 24, 16:00

Draw 7
Thursday, January 24, 21:30

Draw 8
Friday, January 25, 14:30

Draw 9
Friday, January 25, 20:30

Playoffs

1 vs. 2
Saturday, January 26, 19:00

3 vs. 4
Saturday, January 26, 14:00

Semifinal
Sunday, January 27, 12:00

Final
Sunday, January 27, 17:00

Notes

References

External links

2019 in Saskatchewan
January 2019 sports events in Canada
Curling in Saskatchewan
Humboldt, Saskatchewan
2019 Scotties Tournament of Hearts